Joel Louis Lebowitz (born May 10, 1930) is a mathematical physicist widely acknowledged for his outstanding contributions to statistical physics, statistical mechanics and many other fields of Mathematics and Physics.

Lebowitz has published more than five hundred papers concerning statistical physics and science in general, and he is one of the founders and editors of the Journal of Statistical Physics, one of the most important peer-reviewed journals concerning scientific research in this area. He has been president of the New York Academy of Sciences.

Lebowitz is the George William Hill Professor of Mathematics and Physics at Rutgers University. He is also an active member of the human rights community and a long-term co-chair of the Committee of Concerned Scientists.

Biography
Lebowitz was born in Taceva, then in Czechoslovakia, now Ukraine, in 1930 into a Jewish family.  During World War II he was deported with his family to Auschwitz, where  his father, his mother, and his younger sister were killed in 1944. After being liberated from the camp, he moved to United States by boat, and he studied in an Orthodox Jewish school and Brooklyn College. He earned his PhD at Syracuse University in 1956 under the supervision of Peter G. Bergmann. Then he continued his research with Lars Onsager, at Yale University, where he got a faculty position. He moved to the Stevens Institute of Technology in 1957 and to the Belfer Graduate School of Science of Yeshiva University in 1959. Finally he got a faculty position at Rutgers University in 1977, where he holds the prestigious George William Hill Professor position. During his years at the Yeshiva University and Rutgers University he has been in contact with several scientists, and artists, like Fumio Yoshimura and Kate Millett. In 
1975 he founded the Journal of Statistical Physics. In 1979 he was president of the New York Academy of Sciences. He has been one of the most active supporters of dissident scientists in the former Soviet Union, especially refusenik scientists.

Scientific Legacy
Lebowitz has had many important contributions to statistical mechanics and mathematical physics. He proved, along with Elliott Lieb, that the Coulomb interactions obey the thermodynamic limit. He also established what are now known as Lebowitz inequalities for the ferromagnetic Ising model. His current interests are in problems of non-equilibrium statistical mechanics.

He became editor-in-chief the Journal of Statistical Physics in 1975, one of the most important journals in the field, a position he remained in until September 2018. Lebowitz hosts a biannual series of conferences  held, first at Yeshiva University and later at Rutgers University, which has been running for 60 years. He is also known as a co-editor of an influential review series, Phase Transitions and Critical Phenomena.

Awards and honors
Lebowitz has been awarded several honors, such as the Boltzmann Medal (1992), the Nicholson Medal (1994) awarded by the American Physical Society, the Delmer S. Fahrney Medal (1995), the Henri Poincaré Prize (2000), the Volterra Award (2001), the Heineman Prize for Mathematical Physics (2021). His Heineman Prize citation reads: "For seminal contributions to nonequilibrium and equilibrium statistical mechanics, in particular, studies of large deviations in nonequilibrium steady states and rigorous analysis of Gibbs equilibrium ensembles." Among other recognitions, Lebowitz was awarded the Max Planck Medal in 2007 "for his important contributions to the statistical physics of equilibrium and non-equilibrium systems, in particular his contributions to the theory of phase transitions, the dynamics of infinite systems, and the stationary non-equilibrium states" and "for his promoting of new directions of this field at its farthest front, and for enthusiastically introducing several generations of scientists to the field." In 2014 he received the Grande Médaille of the French Academy of Sciences. In 2022 he was awarded the Dirac Medal of the ICTP.

Lebowitz is a member of the United States National Academy of Sciences. In 1966, he became a fellow of the American Physical Society. and in 2012, he became a fellow of the American Mathematical Society.

He received an honorary Doctor of Science degree at Syracuse University's 158th Commencement in 2012.

References

External links

Laudatio for Joel L. Lebowitz by David Ruelle (IHES, Paris) at the Poincaré Prize Ceremony (2000)

1930 births
Members of the United States National Academy of Sciences
Living people
Ukrainian Jews
American people of Ukrainian-Jewish descent
20th-century American  mathematicians
Rutgers University faculty
Syracuse University College of Arts and Sciences alumni
Auschwitz concentration camp survivors
Fellows of the American Mathematical Society
Thermodynamicists
Brooklyn College alumni
Fellows of the American Physical Society
Winners of the Max Planck Medal